The following lists events that happened in 1909 in Iceland.

Incumbents
 Monarch: Frederick VIII
Prime Minister – Hannes Hafstein, Björn Jónsson

Events

 11 April – Ungmennafélagið Afturelding is founded.
 UMFS Dalvík is founded.

Births
15 April – Friðjón Skarphéðinsson, politician (d. 1996).
15 May – Ingólfur Jónsson, politician (d. 1984).
17 July – Guðmundur Ívarsson Guðmundsson, politician (d. 1987)
18 November – Svavar Guðnason, painter (d. 1988)

References

 
Iceland
Iceland
Years of the 20th century in Iceland